Veronica "Roni" Jones-Perry (born January 20, 1997) is an American professional volleyball player who plays as an outside hitter for the United States national team since 2019. Professionally, she plays in  Brazil for Sesc-RJ/Flamengo. 

She previously played professional volleyball for Italian Series A1 team Volley Millenium Brescia and Polish teams Radomka Radom, Budowlani Łódź and ŁKS Commercecon Łódź.

She played collegiately at the Brigham Young University, where she was an All-American in 2017 and 2018. She was named Utah's Female Athlete of the Year following her senior season.

Early life
Jones-Perry, a native of West Jordan, Utah, was involved in gymnastics early in her life, but was forced to quit the sport at age 11 due to her mother being laid off from her job.  She briefly took on softball, but eventually settled on volleyball after her mother's coworker suggested that "gymnasts make good volleyball players". She played volleyball for her high school team at Copper Hills High School and club. Her club coach suggested that she would not make it as the NCAA Division I level. Jones-Perry committed to getting more physically fit and increased her vertical by several inches. This paid off to having several schools interested in her, including BYU and University of Utah.

Jones-Perry initially showed little interest in attending BYU as she is not a Mormon. However, she ultimately opened up to a campus visit, and eventually committed to play for BYU.

Career

College

At BYU, Jones-Perry improved each season. Her freshman season in 2015 she had 171 kills and she was named to the conference's all-freshman team.

In 2017, her junior season, she had 569 kills and 655 total points, earning her AVCA Third Team All-American honors. Her final season in 2018 she earned AVCA First Team All-American and West Coast Conference Player of the Year honors. She helped BYU to a 2018 NCAA Final Four appearance. She had eight kills and nine digs in the loss to eventual national champion Stanford. Jones-Perry finished the 2018 season fourth in the nation in kills per set and points per set and  helped BYU win 27-straight matches.

In April 2019, Jones-Perry was awarded as Utah's Collegiate Female Athlete of the Year by the Utah Sports Commission.

Professional clubs

2019–2020  Volley Millenium Brescia
2019–2020  Radomka Radom (pl)
2020–2021  Budowlani Łódź
2021–2022  ŁKS Commercecon Łódź
2022–present  Sesc-RJ/Flamengo

Jones-Perry has played professionally in Italy, Poland, and Brazil. Notable performances include scoring 38 points on 67 attacks Budowlani Łódź in a 3–1 defeat against Radomka Radom. 

Jones-Perry was named the Most Valuable Player of the Polish Super Cup after helping Budowlani Łódź win the championship. During the season, she was named MVP of the match 9 times and scored a total of 518 points.

United States national team

Jones-Perry joined the national team in 2019. In the 2019 Pan-American Cup, helping U.S. win a gold medal at the competition for the third straight year. Her top performance of the event came against Trinidad & Tobago when she led the team with 14 points on 12 kills, a block and an ace.

At the 2021 Pan-American Cup, Jones-Perry received "Best Outside Hitter" award after leading the team to a bronze medal. She had 13 kills and 2 blocks, which tied for a match-high 15 points amongst all players. 

Jones-Perry helped USA repeat as bronze medalists at the 2022 Pan-American Cup. She had 24 points on 20 kills and 4 aces in the bronze medal match victory against hosts Mexico. In USA's early quarterfinal loss versus Colombia, Jones-Perry had 17 points on 15 kills and 2 blocks.

In 2019, Jones-Perry won a gold medal with USA in the NORCECA Champions Cup (later re-branded as the "Pan American Cup Final Six") tournament. She had 11 kills on 26 attacks and two aces, 22 excellent receptions and nine digs in the championship match victory versus Dominican Republic.

Jones-Perry won a silver medal with the team at the Pan-American Cup Final Six tournament. Notable performances in the tournament included 13 points on 9 kills, one block, and three aces in a 3–0 win against Mexico.

Awards and honors

Clubs

2021–2022 TAURON Liga –  Bronze Medal, with ŁKS Commercecon Łódź.
2020–2021 Polish Super Cup –  Champion, with Budowlani Łódź.
2020–2021 Polish Cup –  Silver Medal, with Budowlani Łódź.
2020–2021 Grand Prix Polskiej Ligi Siatkówki –  Bronze Medal, with Budowlani Łódź.

International

2021 Pan-American Cup – Best Outside Hitter
2020–2021 Polish Super Cup – Most Valuable Player

College

Utah Female Athlete of the Year (Presented by Utah Sports Commission, 2019)
AVCA First Team All-American (2018)
AVCA Pacific South Region Player of the Year (2018)
West Coast Conference Player of the Year (2018)
Honda Sports Award finalist in volleyball (2018)
AVCA Third Team All-American (2017)
West Coast Conference All-Freshman Team (2015)

External links
Team USA bio
CEV Profile
BYU bio

References

1997 births
Living people
Sportspeople from Utah
People from West Jordan, Utah
Opposite hitters
Outside hitters
American women's volleyball players
BYU Cougars women's volleyball players
Brigham Young University alumni
American expatriate sportspeople in Italy
American expatriate sportspeople in Poland
American expatriate sportspeople in Brazil
Expatriate volleyball players in Italy
Expatriate volleyball players in Poland
Expatriate volleyball players in Brazil
Serie A1 (women's volleyball) players